is a Latin phrase meaning the existing state of affairs, particularly with regard to social, political, religious or military issues. In the sociological sense, the status quo refers to the current state of social structure and/or values. With regard to policy debate, it means how conditions are, contrasted with a possible change. For example: "The countries are now trying to maintain the status quo with regard to their nuclear arsenals." To maintain the status quo is to keep things the way they presently are.

The related phrase status quo ante, literally "the status before", refers to the state of affairs that existed previously.

Political usage 

Via social movements the status quo might be overhauled. These seek to alleviate or prevent a particular issue and often to shape social feeling and cultural expression of a society or nation. The status quo is at least in part rejected by their protagonists – progressives – leading the movement.

Advocating to improve the status quo is a persuasive rhetorical device. This is sometimes critiqued as a policy of deliberate ambiguity as not formalizing or defining the adverse situation. 

In democratic meetings, a casting vote will often be subject to a custom that is cast per the status quo, the heart of Speaker Denison's rule. Clark Kerr reportedly said: "The status quo is the only solution that cannot be vetoed".

Karl Marx viewed organized religion as a means for the bourgeoisie to keep the proletariat content with an unequal status quo.

See also 
 Status quo bias
 Status quo ante bellum
 List of Latin phrases
 Status Quo (Jerusalem and Bethlehem)

References

Latin words and phrases
Change
Cognitive inertia